Verónica is a town and localidad in Buenos Aires Province, in Argentina. It is the administrative centre for the county (partido) of Punta Indio.

History
The town was created on 18 March 1915 on land donated by Martín Tornquist, and named after his wife, Verónica Bernal.

A year before, on 1 January 1914, the railroad from the city of La Plata had arrived at Verónica, and a station was built.

In 1925 the Punta Indio Naval Base was established,  from the downtown core. It became one of the pillars for the development of the town until its near dismantlement during the 1990s.

Demographics
From the beginning, the town showed a diversity in people's origins. Besides the traditional Spanish-Italian population, a large number of immigrants from Germany and Eastern Europe (Poland and Croatia among others) established themselves in the area. Today, a German Boarding School (Escuela Hogar de Verónica) serves as a retreat for German schools from all over the country. The town stood in for an Uruguayan town in the American film The City of Your Final Destination released in 2009.

Economic activities
The main activities in the town are related to farming: agriculture, cattle and bird raising. More recently tourism started to develop around the old estancias in the area.

Sports
There are two major sports associations in Verónica: Club Juventud Unida and Club Social y Deportivo Verónica. They compete in regional football tournaments. Until 2001, a Turismo Carretera race was held at the Naval Base.

Transportation
Although the train link has been non-operational for many years, the building of the train station is still operational, although nowadays it is used for cultural associations.
A regular bus service is established between Verónica and La Plata, provided by Expreso La Plata. There are also mini-buses that connect with both La Plata and Buenos Aires.
Local transport circulates within the town, and connects Verónica with Punta Indio and Pipinas.

Climate

Notable Veroniquenses

 Reposo, Daniel Gustavo, Argentine lawyer and politician

References

External links

Punta Indio Website 
History of Verónica in the municipal website 

Populated places in Buenos Aires Province
Populated places established in 1915